De Primera Mano (English: First Hand) is a Mexican entertainment news show produced and broadcast by Imagen Televisión since July 24, 2017. The program is characterized by providing information on the latest shows, from which the criticism and opinion of the conductors will be more objective and direct towards the most controversial and shocking of artists in general.

It is broadcast live from the studios of Ciudad Imagen on Av. Copilco, Coyoacán in Mexico City, Mexico, and is hosted by Gustavo Adolfo Infante, Mónica Noguera and Michelle Ruvalcaba. It currently airs Monday through Friday from 15:00 p.m to 17:00 p.m (UTC).

Promotion
For the promotion of the program, three spots were recorded accompanied by star figures such as the actress Itatí Cantoral, accompanied by her daughter Maria Itatí, Lis Vega and the conductor and actor, Raúl Magaña.

Presenters
 Gustavo Adolfo Infante (2017–present) 
 Mónica Noguera (2017–present)
 Michelle Ruvalcaba (2017–present)

Former
 Alexia Almeida (2017–18)

References

External links
Official website at Imagen Televisión

2017 Mexican television series debuts
2010s Mexican television series
Imagen Televisión original programming
Live television series
Mexican television news shows
Spanish-language television shows